The 1999 Men's EuroFloorball Cup Finals took place in Switzerland from December 27 to December 31, 1999. Warberg IC won the EuroFloorball Cup after defeating Haninge IBK 7-5.

The tournament was known as the 1999 Men's European Cup, but due to name implications, is now known as the 1999 Men's EuroFloorball Cup.

Championship Results

Preliminary round

Conference A

Conference B

Playoffs

Semi-finals

Bronze-medal match

Championship Match

Placement round

7th-place match

5th-place match

Standings

See also
1999 Men's EuroFloorball Cup Qualifying

External links
Standings & Statistics

EuroFloorball Cup
Mens Eurofloorball Cup Finals, 1999